Hrotti is a sword in the Völsung cycle (Fáfnismál, Völsunga saga, 20). It was a part of Fáfnir's treasure, which Sigurðr took after he slew the dragon. Kemp Malone suggested that Hrotti was etymologically related to Hrunting.

References 
Dillmann, François-Xavier. Notes de : Snorri Sturluson. L'Edda : récits de mythologie nordique. Trad. du vieil-islandais, intr. et annoté par François-Xavier Dillmann. Paris : Gallimard, 2003. (L'Aube des peuples). P. 202. .

Mythological Norse weapons
Mythological swords